Cayoosh Mountain is a  mountain summit located in the Cayoosh Range in southwestern British Columbia, Canada. Its nearest higher peak is Mount Marriott,  to the north-northeast. Precipitation runoff from the peak drains into Cayoosh Creek and other tributaries of the Fraser River. The mountain's name was submitted by Karl Ricker, a mountaineer, and was officially adopted on January 23, 1979, by the Geographical Names Board of Canada.

Climate

Based on the Köppen climate classification, Cayoosh Mountain is located in a subarctic climate zone of western North America. Most weather fronts originate in the Pacific Ocean, and travel east toward the Coast Mountains where they are forced upward by the range (Orographic lift), causing them to drop their moisture in the form of rain or snowfall. As a result, the Coast Mountains experience high precipitation, especially during the winter months in the form of snowfall. Winter temperatures can drop below −20 °C with wind chill factors below −30 °C. This climate supports a glacier on the northeast slope of this mountain. The months July through September offer the most favorable weather for climbing Cayoosh Mountain.

Climbing Routes
Established climbing routes on Cayoosh Mountain:
   
 East Face - a winter route
 Southwest Ridge -  First ascent 1978
 South Ridge -  
 North Ridge -

Gallery

See also

 Geography of British Columbia
 Geology of British Columbia

References

External links
 Weather: Cayoosh Mountain 
 Climbing Cayoosh in winter: YouTube

Two-thousanders of British Columbia
Lillooet Ranges